Stillwater is an unincorporated community in King County, in the U.S. state of Washington.

History
A post office called Stillwater was established in 1910, and remained in operation until 1925. The community was named after Stillwater, Minnesota, the native home of a large share of local loggers.

References

External links
Stillwater Elementary School

Unincorporated communities in King County, Washington
Unincorporated communities in Washington (state)